The 1905 Minnesota Golden Gophers football team represented the University of Minnesota in the 1905 Western Conference football season. In their sixth year under head coach Henry L. Williams, the Golden Gophers compiled a 10–1 record (2–1 against Western Conference opponents), shut out 9 of 11 opponents, and outscored all opponents 542 to 22.

Schedule

References

Minnesota
Minnesota Golden Gophers football seasons
Minnesota Golden Gophers football